Dominique Martin (born 1 October 1961) is a National Front MEP representing South-East France.

References

1961 births
Living people
MEPs for South-East France 2014–2019
National Rally (France) MEPs